Oregon Route 255 (OR 255) is an Oregon state highway running from U.S. Route 101 (US 101) near Gold Beach to US 101 near Brookings. OR 255 is known as the Carpenterville Highway No. 255 (see Oregon highways and routes).

OR 255 was established in 2003 as part of Oregon's project to assign route numbers to highways that previously were not assigned.

Route description
OR 255 begins at an intersection with US 101 approximately four miles south of Gold Beach and heads south  to an intersection with US 101. After the concurrency ends, OR 255 continues south through Carpenterville, ending at an intersection with US 101 approximately one mile north of Brookings.

History
OR 255 is a former section of U.S. 101.  OR 255 was assigned to the Carpenterville Highway in 2003.

On February 26, 2019, the Hooskanadan Slide took out a nearly quarter-mile long section of U.S. 101, causing the road to slough away in places and buckle in others. ODOT closed the highway at milepost 344; OR 255 serves as a detour for the time being. Travelers are advised that the Carpenterville Highway is a narrow, winding road, with extreme elevation changes, spots of gravel, and a spot that is reduced to a single lane. Commercial traffic is restricted on the road; ODOT has established checkpoints at both ends of the highway to enforce the restrictions.

Trucks attempting to travel between Brookings (or points south) and Pistol River (or points north) can find a viable detour via US 199 in Crescent City to Interstate 5 in Grants Pass, then heading north to Winston and heading west on OR 42 back to U.S. 101. Truckers circling back to Gold Beach or Pistol River  can follow OR 42S from Coquille to Bandon; traffic continuing further north on the coast can follow OR 42 all the way to Coos Bay. Southbound traffic drives this route in reverse.

Major intersections
The beginning milepoint for OR 255 conforms to the milepoints for US 101.

References

External links
 Oregon State Archives, 1940 Oregon Coast Tour: Port Orford to California Line

255
Transportation in Curry County, Oregon